Jim or James Roach may refer to:

 Jim Roach (footballer) (1864–1955), English footballer
 Jim Roach (producer) (born 1977), American producer and songwriter
 James Terry Roach (1960–1986), executed by the state of South Carolina